KTJT-LP (103.1 FM) is a radio station licensed to Davenport, Iowa, United States, and serving the Quad Cities area. The station is currently owned by the Davenport Educational Association and carries programming from Relevant Radio.

References

External links
 

TJT-LP
Davenport, Iowa
TJT-LP